Kate Roberts may refer to: 
 Kate Roberts (author) (1891–1985), Welsh-language author
 Kate Roberts (YouthAIDS), founder of educational and AIDS prevention campaign
 Kate Roberts (Days of Our Lives), character in the soap opera Days of Our Lives
 Kate Roberts (Scream), character in the slasher film Scream 4
 Kate Roberts (triathlete) (born 1983), South African triathlete
 Vulcana (1875–1946), Welsh strongwoman sometimes called Kate Roberts

See also
 Katherine Roberts (disambiguation)